The hybrid elm cultivar Ulmus × hollandica 'Macrophylla Aurea' was listed by Bean in Kew Hand-List Trees & Shrubs, ed. 3, 273, 1925 as U . montana var. macrophylla aurea, but without description.

Description
A tree with large, golden leaves.

Cultivation
No specimens are known to survive. An U. Macrophylla aurea appeared in the 1904 catalogue of Kelsey's, New York, where it was described as a vigorous tree with a graceful habit and large, distinctive yellow foliage.

Synonymy
?Ulmus americana macrophylla aurea: Späth nursery (Berlin, Germany), catalogue 116, p. 125, 1904–05.

References

Dutch elm cultivar
Ulmus articles missing images
Ulmus
Missing elm cultivars